The HomePlug Powerline Alliance is a trade association of electronics manufacturers, service providers, and retailers that establishes standards for, and tests members' devices for compliance to, the various power line communication technologies known as HomePlug.

The alliance developed standards for applications such as in-home distribution of TV, gaming and  Internet access. It also developed a  specification for smart power meters and in-home communications between electric systems and appliances. The alliance tests for interoperability and certifies products based on HomePlug specifications and IEEE 1901 standards.

On 18 October 2016, the HomePlug Alliance announced that all of its specifications would be put into the public domain and that other organizations would be taking on future activities relating to deployment of the existing technologies.  There was no mention in the announcement of any further technology development within the HomePlug community.
Homeplug is essentially defunct as of at least June 2022

History
Founded in 2000, the HomePlug Powerline Alliance's goal was to create a standard to use existing home electrical wiring to communicate between products and connect to the Internet.
The Alliance evaluated several technologies and proposals and subsequently developed, approved and published the HomePlug 1.0 specification in June 2001. In 2005 it published the HomePlug AV specification, which increased physical layer peak data rates from 14 to 200 Mbit/s. It approved and published the HomePlug Command and Control specification in 2007 and the HomePlug Green PHY specification in June 2010.
The organization has 69 members and has certified over 200 products in 2010.

See also
 IEEE 1901
 HD-PLC

References

Technology trade associations